Cracovians (Polish: Krakowiacy) are an ethnographic subgroup of the Polish nation, who resides in the historic region of Lesser Poland around the city of Kraków. They use their own dialect, which belongs to the Lesser Polish dialect cluster of the Polish language, and are mostly Roman Catholic.

The Cracowians are divided into two geographic subgroups, the Eastern Cracowians who inhabit the areas north and east of Kraków from Jędrzejów and Miechów to Tarnów, and the Western Cracowians who reside west and north of Kraków — their traditional dress is considered to be the quintessential Kraków folk costume (stroj krakowski).

In the south (north of the Gorals), the extent of the Cracowians reaches the line marked by the towns of Bielsko-Biała, Wadowice, Kalwaria Zebrzydowska, Myślenice, Lipnica Murowana and Tarnów. In the east, the boundary between the Krakowiacy and the Sandomierzacy is not well established, reaching as far as Tarnów and Połaniec. In the west, the Cracowians reaches the Przemsza river, which has for centuries marked the border between Lesser Poland and Silesia. In the north, they reach the line marked by Częstochowa and Kielce.

The folklore of the Cracowians inspired several Polish artists, especially in the Young Poland period. Furthermore, Wojciech Bogusławski's "Krakowiacy i Gorale", regarded as the first Polish national opera, premiered in Warsaw on 1 March 1794.

Sources 
 Encyklopedia Polski. wyd. Wydawnictwo Ryszard Kluszczynski, Kraków 1996.

Notes 

Lesser Poland Voivodeship
Ethnic groups in Poland